Engaewa is a genus of burrowing crayfish belonging to the family Parastacidae. There are five recognised species, all endemic to the high-rainfall zone of south-west Western Australia, from Dunsborough to Albany. They are all small (up to 5 cm), and found only in freshwater swamps and seepages. Three of the five species are listed under the Environment Protection and Biodiversity Conservation Act 1999 (EPBC Act) and are listed on the IUCN Red List as "endangered" (EN) or "critically endangered" (CR), while the remaining two are listed as "Least Concern":

References

Parastacidae
Endemic fauna of Southwest Australia
Freshwater crustaceans of Australia
Warren bioregion